Who's on First is a 1980 American spy thriller novel written by William F. Buckley Jr., the third of eleven novels in the Blackford Oakes series.

Plot
CIA agent Blackford Oakes is sent to Hungary amid the Hungarian Uprising of 1956.

References
Citations

Bibliography

 
 

1980 American novels
Blackford Oakes novels
Novels set in Hungary
Novels set in the 1950s
Hungarian Revolution of 1956 fiction
Doubleday (publisher) books